The 1907 Massachusetts gubernatorial election was held on November 5. Incumbent Republican Governor Curtis Guild Jr. was re-elected for a third one-year term.

The election was noted for the split in the Democratic Party and the very strong third-party performance for Independence Party nominee Thomas Hisgen. Hisgen actually received more votes than the Democratic ticket, though Democratic nominee Henry M. Whitney received more votes than Hisgen when considering votes Whitney received on three independent tickets.

Republican nomination

Candidates
Curtis Guild Jr., incumbent Governor

Campaign
The contest for the Republican nomination was seen as a referendum on the Roosevelt administration. The Massachusetts political establishment, led by Senator Henry Cabot Lodge and Governor Guild, was solidly in support of Roosevelt, Lodge's close personal friend. Republican critics of Governor Guild included State Senator Arthur M. Taft, over the governor's allegedly insufficient support for the protective tariff.

Democratic nomination

Candidates
Charles W. Bartlett, attorney and Democratic nominee for Governor in 1905
Henry Melville Whitney, industrialist and Democratic nominee for Lt. Governor in 1905

Campaign
In a poll taken of the Democratic state legislators in May, 25 favored Whitney and 8 favored Bartlett, with 5 scattering and 32 noncommittal.

Convention
The Democratic convention was held in Springfield on October 5. Whitney delegates gained control of the convention hall and barred Bartlett delegates from entry. The Bartlett delegates assembled themselves to nominate their candidate and adopt their own platform. Bartlett's supporters were generally aligned with the presidential campaign of William Jennings Bryan, while Whitney's were in opposition to Bryan's third campaign for the Democratic nomination. Bartlett supporters also cited seniority and Whitney's support of the merger of the New York, New Haven and Hartford Railroad and Boston and Maine Corporation.

Aftermath
Whitney's nomination led Grenville MacFarland, the Chairman of the Democratic State Committee, to resign his post and his membership in the State Committee. MacFarland felt that Whitney represented corporate interests over "true Democratic principles" in his support of the merger of New York, New Haven and Hartford with Boston and Maine railroads.

General election

Candidates
Charles W. Bartlett, attorney and Democratic nominee for Governor in 1905 (Anti-Merger)
John W. Brown (Socialist)
Thomas F. Brennan (Socialist Labor)
Hervey S. Cowell (Prohibition)
Curtis Guild Jr., incumbent Governor (Republican)
Thomas Hisgen, petroleum businessman (Independence)
Henry Melville Whitney, industrialist and Democratic nominee for Lt. Governor in 1905 (Democratic-Independent)

Campaign
The split in the Democratic Party assured Guild of re-election in the normally Republican state. Guild ran a quiet, positive campaign emphasizing his record in office, largely ignoring his three main opponents. He characterized his party's record as: "a larger amount of progress legislation, a larger amount of radical reorganization of state institutions, and for a larger amount of new appointments than has ever occurred before in any similar period in the whole history of the commonwealth."

Results

See also
 1907 Massachusetts legislature

Notes

References

Governor
1907
Massachusetts
November 1907 events